Nada es para siempre is a Spanish teen drama television series that originally aired on Antena 3 from July 1999 to December 2000. It is an adaptation of the Venezuelan telenovela A todo corazón.

Premise 
The plot tracks the vicissitudes of a group of highschoolers.

Cast

Production 
Consisting of an adaptation of the Venezuelan telenovela A todo corazón, the series was created by Carlos Cerutti, Alberto Giarrocco and Jose A. Méndez. The series was shot in A Coruña. The Colegio Obradoiro served to portray the fictional high school.

The series premiered on Antena 3 on 5 July 1999, ending its broadcasting run in December 2000, after 2 seasons and 375 episodes. Laura Visconti, developing the A todo corazón'''s remake titled A puro corazón, also drew inspiration from the subplots of Nada es para siempre''.

References 

1999 Spanish television series debuts
2000 Spanish television series endings
1990s Spanish drama television series
2000s Spanish drama television series
Spanish teen drama television series
Spanish-language television shows
Antena 3 (Spanish TV channel) network series
Television series about teenagers
Television shows filmed in Spain
Spanish television series based on non-Spanish television series